Battery "H" 1st Michigan Light Artillery Regiment also known as 8th Battery Michigan Light Artillery, was an artillery battery from Michigan that served in the Union Army during the American Civil War. The unit also went by the name De Golyer's Battery or De Golyer's 8th Michigan Battery after its commander, Captain Samuel De Golyer.

Service
Battery "H"  was organized at Monroe, Michigan and mustered into service on  March 6, 1862.

The battery was mustered out on July 22, 1865.

Total strength and casualties
Over its existence, the battery carried a total of 336 men on its muster rolls.

The battery lost 2 officers and 3 enlisted men killed in action or mortally wounded and 42 enlisted men who died of disease, for a total of 47
fatalities.

Commanders
Captain Major F. Lockwood
 Captain Samuel De Goyer

See also
List of Michigan Civil War Units
Michigan in the American Civil War
Captain (Then Lt.) Marcus D. Elliot assumed command after the death of Captain DeGoyler, 8 August 1863.

Captain (Brevet) William H. Justin assumed Command during the Battle of Atlanta and the Battle of Lovejoy Station in August 1864.

Notes

References
The Civil War Archive
NPS.gov

Artillery
1865 disestablishments in Michigan
Artillery units and formations of the American Civil War
1862 establishments in Michigan
Military units and formations established in 1862
Military units and formations disestablished in 1865